Proper integral  is a kind of integral in Integral calculus, a branch of Mathematics in Calculus .

Definition 
A integral with finite value of Limit of a function and whose value does not approach to infinity.

 is finite and

Conditions 
Every integral whose value is finite is not proper integral until the limit existence is ensured.

Limit existence is possible when the limit at right and left neighborhood is equal to limit itself. This condition ensures the integral to be proper integral.

Properties 
It has Properties of addition and subtraction

1.Addition

2. Subtraction

References 

Mathematics
Calculus
Integral calculus